Mauro Gatti (born 12 June 1937 in Florence) is a retired Italian professional football player and coach.

Honours
 Coppa Italia winner: 1961/62.

External links
 Career summary by playerhistory.com 

1937 births
Living people
Italian footballers
Serie A players
Serie B players
A.C. Reggiana 1919 players
Inter Milan players
S.S.C. Napoli players
Calcio Padova players
Italian football managers
Calcio Padova managers
Association football defenders
A.S.D. Fanfulla players